Trichotroea semiflava is a species of beetle in the family Cerambycidae, and the only species in the genus Trichotroea. It was described by Breuning in 1956.

References

Desmiphorini
Beetles described in 1956